Halfway or Half Way may refer to:

Places

Canada
Halfway, New Brunswick, a community in Durham Parish
Halfway, Ontario, a community in Madawaska Valley

Ireland
Halfway, County Cork, a village in the Republic of Ireland

United Kingdom
Halfway, Berkshire, England
Halfway, Sheffield, England
Halfway, Wiltshire, a hamlet in Upton Scudamore, England
Halfway, Glasgow, Scotland
Halfway, South Lanarkshire, Scotland
Halfway, Carmarthenshire, Wales, a village in the United Kingdom

United States
Halfway, Kentucky
Halfway, Illinois, a former community in Williamson County, Illinois
Halfway, Illinois (Little Juarez), a former community in Williamson County, Illinois
Halfway, Maryland
Halfway, Michigan, former name of Eastpointe, Michigan
Halfway, Missouri
Halfway (RIRTR station), a former railway station in Rochester, New York
Halfway, Oregon
Halfway, Virginia
Halfway, Wyoming

Film and television
Halfway (2016 film), an American drama film by Ben Caird
Halfway (EastEnders), a character in EastEnders

Music
Halfway (band), a band from Brisbane, Australia
"Halfway", a 2008 song by Algebra from Purpose
"Halfway", a 2019 song by James Blunt from Once Upon a Mind
“Halfway”, a 2021 song by Mimi Webb from Seven Shades of Heartbreak

Other uses
Halfway, a video game published by Chucklefish
Halfway, a brand of folding bicycle made by Giant Manufacturing

See also
Midpoint